is a Japanese film director. Many of her works have been documentaries, including Embracing, about her search for the father who abandoned her as a child, and Katatsumori, about the grandmother who raised her.

Early life and education
Growing up in the rural region of Nara, Japan, Kawase's parents split early on in her childhood, leaving her to be raised by her great-aunt, with whom she held a combative, yet loving, relationship.

She originally attended the Osaka School of Photography (Ōsaka Shashin Senmon Gakkō; now Visual Arts College Osaka)to study television production, and later became interested in film, deciding to switch her focus. She was a student of Shunji Dodo at the college, and graduated in 1989.

Career
After graduating,  she spent an additional four years at the college as a lecturer before releasing Embracing. Employing her interest in autobiography, most of her first short films focus on her turbulent family history, including her abandonment and her father's death. Many of her first forays into filmmaking were autobiographical, inspired heavily by the rural landscape.

Between 1994 and 1996, she released a trilogy of films about her great-aunt: Katatsumori, See Heaven and Sun on the Horizon. She novelized her films Suzaku and Firefly.

In 2006, she released the forty-minute documentary Tarachime, which she prefers to be screened before her film from the following year. Tarachime revisits Kawase's relationship with her great-aunt, tackling very personal themes such as her aunt's growing dementia.

Kawase completed production on her fourth full-length film The Mourning Forest (Mogari no Mori), which premièred in June 2007 in her hometown Nara and went on to win the Grand Prix at the 2007 Cannes Film Festival.

Her 2011 film Hanezu premiered in competition at the 2011 Cannes Film Festival.

Pop star Hikaru Utada asked Kawase to create the music video for her 2012 single "Sakura Nagashi" (桜流し, lit. "Flowing Cherry Blossoms/Cherry Blossoms Sinking"), later to be included on Utada's 2016 album Fantôme.

In 2013 Kawase was selected as a member of the main competition jury at the 2013 Cannes Film Festival.

Her 2014 film Still the Water was selected to compete for the Palme d'Or in the main competition section at the 2014 Cannes Film Festival. Her 2015 film Sweet Bean was screened in the Un Certain Regard section at the 2015 Cannes Film Festival.

In April 2016 she was announced as the President of the Jury for the Cinéfondation and short films section of the 2016 Cannes Film Festival.

On October 23, 2018, it was announced that Kawase had been selected by the IOC to shoot the official film for the 2020 Tokyo Olympics. Scheduled to be released in 2022, the film places the 2020 Olympics within the wider context of the COVID-19 pandemic and the mixed reactions to the games from Japanese society. NHK aired a documentary about the making of Kawase's documentary on December 26, 2021. Footage and captions in the documentary alleged that protesters were being paid money to attend anti-Olympics rallies. One of the men interviewed later stated he was "unsure" if he had actually attended any anti-Olympics rallies. NHK Osaka cited "editorial oversights" and "deficiencies in research," issuing an apology. They denied that the footage was deliberately fabricated to be misleading. On January 13, 2022, the NHK Osaka director Terunobu Maeda apologized during a press conference, admitting that the captions "should not have been included." Again he denied that the incident was a fabrication.

In April 2022, Shūkan Bunshun reported that Kawase physically assaulted a camera assistant while filming True Mothers in May 2019, leading cinematographer Yūta Tsukinaga and his team to resign mid-production. Kawase did not deny the allegation. In May 2022, the magazine also reported that she assaulted an employee at her production company, Kumie, in October 2015. The employee was reportedly punched in the face with a closed fist and chased through the office by Kawase.

Styles and themes
Kawase's work is heavily concerned with the distorted space between fiction and non-fiction that has occurred within the state of modern Japanese society, approaching "fiction with a documentarian's gaze." She employs this documentary-realism to focus on individuals of lesser cultural status, challenging prevailing representations of women within the male-dominated Japanese film industry. This theme is also connected to her own personal reflections on contemporary issues in the current climate of economic depression such as the declining birthrate, alienation, and the collapse of traditional family structures.

She frequently shoots on location with amateur actors.

Kawase's style also invokes the autobiographical practices related to documentary style. Familiar and personal objects such as childhood photographs, and to explore her family history and identity. Her work reflects the personal, intimate, and domestic. Themes that are often associated with feminist practices and Women’s Cinema.

However, Kawase herself does not classify as a feminist due to Japanese feminism's tendency to persist collective identity and view women’s problems through a narrow ideological lens. Instead, she looks at gender as a creative and fluid realm, rather than as a negative fixation. Kawase explains:

Kawase’s films challenge cinematic conventions. Her subjects are primarily family and friends, and she frequently depicts the relationships between the filmmaker and the subject, and is self-reflexive of her own thoughts and emotions in her works.

Awards
She became the youngest winner of the la Caméra d'Or award (best new director) at the 1997 Cannes Film Festival for her first 35mm film, Suzaku.

This is a list of some of her awards:
1997: Camera D'Or, Cannes International Film Festival: Suzaku
1999: Special Mention Prize, Vision du Reel: The Weald
2000: FIPRESCI Prize: Hotaru
2000: CICAE Prize: Hotaru
2000: Best Achievement Award in Cinematography and Directing, Buenos Aires International Film Festival: Hotaru
2007: Special Prize, Yamagata International Film Festival: Tarachime
2007: Grand Prix, Cannes International Film Festival: The Mourning Forest
2015: Chevalier Ordre des Arts et des Lettres of France
2017: Ecumenical Jury Prize, Cannes International Film Festival: Radiance
2021: Mainichi Film Award for Best Director: True Mothers

Filmography
Kawase's work was originally produced in various media: 8mm film, 16mm film, 35mm film, and video.

I focus on that which interests me (1988, 5′)
The concretization of these things flying around me (1988, 5′)
My J-W-F (1988, 10′)
Papa's Icecream (1988, 5′)
My Solo Family (1989, 10′)
Presently (1989, 5′)
A Small Largeness (1989, 10′)
The Girl's Daily Bread (1990, 10′)
 Like Happiness (1991, 20′)
 Embracing (1992, 40′)
 White Moon (1993, 55′)
 Katatsumori (1994, 40′)
 See Heaven (1995, 10′)
 Memory of the Wind (1995, 30′)
 This World (1996, 8′)
 Sun on the Horizon (1996, 45′)
 Suzaku (1997, 95′)
 The Weald (1997, 73′)
 Kaleidoscope (Mangekyō) (1999, 81′)
 Firefly (Hotaru) (2000, 164′)
 Sky, Wind, Fire, Water, Earth (2001, 55′)
 Letter from a Yellow Cherry Blossom (Tsuioku no dansu) (2003, 65′)
 Shara (Sharasōju) (2003, 100′)
 Kage (Shadow) (2006, 26′)
 Tarachime (2006, 43′)
 The Mourning Forest (Mogari No Mori) (2007, 97′)
 Nanayomachi 「七夜待」(2008)
 In Between Days (2009) 
 Visitors  (2009) (segment "Koma")
 Genpin (2010)
 Hanezu (2011)
 60 Seconds of Solitude in Year Zero (2011)
 Chiri (2012)
 Still the Water (2014)
 Sweet Bean (2015)
 Radiance (2017)
 Vision (2018)
 Tokyo 2020 Official Film (2020)
 True Mothers (2020)

References

Sources
 .
 .
 .
 .

External links

 
  
 Interview with Kawase Naomi – Documentary Box (Interviewer: Aaron Gerow)
 Interview with Naomi Kawase – Meniscus Magazine
 at Rotterdam Film Festival 
 at Punto de Vista Documentary Film Festival of Navarra 
 

1969 births
Living people
Japanese women cinematographers
Japanese women film directors
Japanese cinematographers
Japanese documentary filmmakers
Japanese film directors
Japanese film editors
Japanese film producers
Japanese women film producers
Japanese screenwriters
People from Nara, Nara
Japanese women screenwriters
Chevaliers of the Ordre des Arts et des Lettres
Japanese women editors
Women film editors
Women documentary filmmakers
Directors of Caméra d'Or winners